The UEFA European Under-18 Championship 1965 Final Tournament was held in West Germany.

Teams
The following teams entered the tournament:

 
 
 
 
 
 
 
  (host)

Group stage

Group A

Group B

Group C

Group D

Group E

Group F

Group G

Group H

Quarterfinals

Semifinals

Places 5-8

Places 1-4

Final Matches

Seventh-place match

Fifth-place match

Third-place match

Final

External links
Results by RSSSF

UEFA European Under-19 Championship
Under-18
1965
1965 in West German sport
April 1965 sports events in Europe
1965 in youth association football